Edward Salterne Litteljohn (24 September 1878 – 22 January 1955) was an English first-class cricketer active 1900–14 who played for Middlesex. He was born in Hanwell; died in Beaconsfield.

References

1878 births
1955 deaths
English cricketers
Middlesex cricketers